Sai Van Lake is a man-made lake in Sé, Macau. It is one of two man made lakes in Macau. It is located at the southern tip of Macau Peninsula.

The lake was once a bay and closed off by infill. Sai Van means West Bay. Sai Van Lake is separated with Nam Van Lake by Avenida Dr Stanley Ho.

See also
 Nam Van Lake

References

Lakes of Macau
Water in Macau
Sé, Macau